Hidde C Overdijk (born 29 April 1996) is a Dutch cricketer. He made his Twenty20 debut for the Netherlands in the 2018 MCC Tri-Nation Series against the Marylebone Cricket Club on 29 July 2018. He made his Twenty20 International (T20I) on the same day, against Nepal. Earlier in the same month, he was named in the Netherlands' One Day International (ODI) squad for their series against Nepal, but he did not play.

References

External links
 

1996 births
Living people
Dutch cricketers
Netherlands Twenty20 International cricketers
Sportspeople from The Hague